Kyle Alfonso Myricks (born October 30, 1982), better known by his stage name Stalley, is an American rapper from Massillon, Ohio.

Music career 
In 2008, Stalley made his mixtape debut, titled Goin Ape, with fellow Ohio-native rapper Terry Urban. In 2009, he followed with the release of the new mixtape, titled MadStalley: The Autobiography, and a newfound reputation as a force on stage. Stalley attended the 2010 Iron Mic Competition in Beijing as the featured MC.

2011–2017: Maybach Music Group
After Stalley signed a deal to Rick Ross' Maybach Music Group (MMG) label. Stalley has worked with producers Ski Beatz on the tracks, including "Address", "S.T.A.L.L.E.Y.", "Do It Big", and "Harsh Ave". Artist, named Rashad Thomas, was featured on album Lincoln Way Nights and a recording artist, named J. Rawls would be featured on the track "Babblin".

Stalley was featured on Curren$y's Universal/Def Jam album Pilot Talk on the track "Address" (released in June 2010), as well as he featured on Ski Beatz's Universal/Def Jam projects– including 24 Hour Karate School and 24 Hour Karate School, Pt. 2. In February 2011, Stalley completed a sports-themed music project, commissioned by ESPN, for future use in television and online programming. Stalley's Lincoln Way Nights (released in February 2011) has received 130K+ downloads and reigned at number 2 for Bandcamp hip hop releases. Lincoln Way Nights (released in November 2011) debuted at number 18 on the iTunes hip hop charts and has sold 4K+ copies. Stalley also was featured on the Maybach Music Group albums, including Vol. 1 and Vol. 2, along with Rick Ross's mixtape Rich Forever. He also appeared on Ross' fifth studio album God Forgives, I Don't.

His most recent mixtape Savage Journey To The American Dream (released in March 2012), which reached 100K downloads in the first week, and was featured as the Stereogum Mixtape of the Week and the Spin Rap Release of the Week (7 out of 10). It was graded an XL by XXL, and HipHopDX awarded it 3.5 out of 5. The mixtape almost entirely produced by Huntsville, AL underground veterans Block Beattaz. Stalley's debut retail single "Swangin" featuring Scarface, from his Honest Cowboy, released on March 26, 2013 reuses a beat from G-Side's namesake track "Swangin" off their 2008 album "Starshipz & Rocketz", also produced by Block Beattaz. The music video was released on July 9, 2013 and featured a cameo from Paul Wall. On August 8, 2013, following of his mixtape's release, it was met with generally positive reviews from critics such as PopMatters. After it was revealed, it received a nomination at the 2013's BET Hip Hop Awards for the "Best Mixtape Category". After receiving a great response from his label, he released Honest Cowboy: EP to iTunes on September 17, 2013, which is on the same day as the release of the label's third compilation album Self Made Vol. 3.

On August 22, 2014, Stalley announced his debut album, Ohio, and four days later, he announced October 27 as the release date.

On August 21, 2015, almost one year since announcing his debut album, Stalley released a seven track mixtape, titled The Laughing Introvert. On January 25, 2016, Stalley released his 7th mixtape titled Saving Yusuf.

2017–present: Independent 
In 2017, Stalley released his second and third albums through Real Talk Entertainment, New Wave and Another Level. In an August 4 interview with Respect. magazine, he confirmed he was now independent.

In continuation of his independent releases, Stalley released the Tell The Truth: Shame the Devil in late 2017. The EP was the first in a trilogy, with Vols. 2 and 3 released in 2018.

On November 1, 2019, Stalley released an album titled Reflection Of Self: The Head Trip, a collaboration entirely produced by West Coast beatmaker Jansport J. The album was self-released on his Blue Collar Gang imprint.

Stalley announced a full length project, titled Blacklight, entirely produced by Apollo Brown on the independent Mello Music Group label. Set for release on November 19, 2021, the album has features from Joell Ortiz and Skyzoo, who both also separately collaborated with Apollo Brown on their own recent albums.

Personal life
Stalley is a Muslim. When asked about his beard, he revealed he wanted something to grow with him as he grew as an artist, and "Second, I am a Sunni Muslim and it’s part of my religion and me reflecting on all the prophets and great men who had beards before me who were all wise and humbled in their ways of greatness."

Discography

Singles

As lead artist

As featured artist

Guest appearances

References

External links

1982 births
Living people
People from Massillon, Ohio
African-American male rappers
African-American Muslims
Rappers from Ohio
Midwest hip hop musicians
21st-century American rappers
American Sunni Muslims
21st-century American male musicians
Atlantic Records artists
21st-century African-American musicians
20th-century African-American people